"Most People Get Married" is a popular song, published in 1962.  The song's music was written by Leon Carr, the lyrics by Earl Shuman.

Patti Page recording
A version by Patti Page charted in 1962, reaching No. 27 on the Billboard chart. The presence of Patti Page brought the rockabilly-tinged song to the easy listening survey, where it peaked at No. 8.

Cover versions
In 1962, the song was also recorded by Joan Regan in the United Kingdom.  This recording featured an accompaniment directed by Peter Knight with the Babs Knight Singers.
In 1977, Jeannie C. Riley included a cover on her, Jeannie C. Riley, Fancy Friends, From Nashville With Love, LP.

References

External links
Song lyric

Songs with music by Leon Carr
Songs with lyrics by Earl Shuman
Patti Page songs
1962 songs
1962 singles